The 2004–05 CEV Champions League was the 46th edition of the highest level European volleyball club competition organised by the European Volleyball Confederation.

League round

Pool A

|}

Pool B

|}

Pool C

|}

Pool D

|}

Playoffs

Playoff 12

|}

First leg

|}

Second leg

|}

Playoff 6

|}

First leg

|}

Second leg

|}

Final Four
Organizer:  Iraklis Thessaloniki
 Place: Thessaloniki
All times on 26 March are Eastern European Time (UTC+02:00) and all times on 27 March are Eastern European Summer Time (UTC+03:00).

Semifinals

|}

3rd place match

|}

Final

|}

Final standings

Awards

Most Valuable Player
  Vladimir Nikolov (Tours VB)
Best Scorer
  Clayton Stanley (Iraklis Thessaloniki) 
Best Spiker
  Alejandro Spajić (Lokomotiv Belgorod) 
Best Server
  Clayton Stanley (Iraklis Thessaloniki) 

Best Blocker
  Alexandre Sloboda (Tours VB)
Best Receiver
  Theodoros Baev (Iraklis Thessaloniki) 
Best Libero
  Hubert Henno (Tours VB)
Best Setter
  Lloy Ball (Iraklis Thessaloniki)

External links
 2004/05 European Champions League

CEV Champions League
2004 in volleyball
2005 in volleyball